Herbert Joseph Pedersen (born April 27, 1944, in Berkeley, California) is an American musician, guitarist, banjo player, and singer-songwriter who has played a variety of musical styles over the past fifty years including country, bluegrass, progressive bluegrass, folk, folk rock, country rock, and has worked with numerous musicians in many different bands.

Biography
Pedersen often performs with Chris Hillman, and both were once members of the Desert Rose Band. Pedersen also fronted his own band called the Laurel Canyon Ramblers.  Besides this, Pedersen has also worked with the following musicians and groups: John Fogerty, Mudcrutch, Pine Valley Boys, Michael Martin Murphey, Earl Scruggs, The Dillards, Smokey Grass Boys, The New Kentucky Colonels, Old & In the Way, David Grisman, Peter Rowan, Vassar Clements, Gram Parsons, Emmylou Harris, Skip Battin, Tony Rice, Dan Fogelberg, Stephen Stills, Linda Ronstadt, Kris Kristofferson, John Prine, Jackson Browne, John Denver, John Jorgenson, Leland Sklar, and Rice, Rice, Hillman and Pedersen, Vern and Ray, among others.

Discography
Southwest (1976) Epic
Sandman (1977) Epic
Lonesome Feeling (1984) Sugar Hill

Collaborations 
 Linda Ronstadt (album) - Linda Ronstadt (1971)
 Don't Cry Now - Linda Ronstadt (1973)
 Grievous Angel - Gram Parsons (1974)
 Fall Into Spring - Rita Coolidge (1974)
 Heart Like a Wheel - Linda Ronstadt (1974)
 Pieces of the Sky - Emmylou Harris (1975)
 Elite Hotel - Emmylou Harris (1975)
 Prisoner in Disguise - Linda Ronstadt (1975)
 Dane Donohue - Dane Donohue (1978)
 Mudcrutch (Tom Petty) (2016)

References

External links
Official Herb Pedersen Website
 

Guitarists from California
American country guitarists
American male guitarists
American bluegrass musicians
American country rock musicians
American banjoists
The Desert Rose Band members
1944 births
Living people
Musicians from Berkeley, California
20th-century American guitarists
Country musicians from California
20th-century American male musicians
Old & In the Way members
The Dillards members
Lyle Lovett and His Large Band members